For the Canadian neo-nazi group see Western Guard Party

The Western Guard is a newspaper serving Madison and Lac qui Parle County in western Minnesota. It is published once a week on Wednesdays and has 2,100 subscribers.

References

External links
Listing in Minnesota Newspapers Directory
Profile on Goliath

Newspapers published in Minnesota